The 2007–08 Anaheim Ducks season began September 29, 2007, with a game in London, England, against the Los Angeles Kings. It was the Ducks' 15th season of operation in the National Hockey League (NHL). They began the season as defending Stanley Cup champions.

Key dates prior to the start of the season:

The 2007 NHL Entry Draft took place in Columbus, Ohio, on June 22–23.
The free agency period began on July 1.

Schedule and results

Preseason 

|- align="center" bgcolor="#ffbbbb"
| 1 || September 13 || Kings || 5–4 ||  || Aubin (1–0–0) || Levasseur  (0–1–0) || 16,973* || 0–1–0 || Honda Center || L1
|- align="center" bgcolor="#bbffbb"
| 2 || September 15 || @ Kings || 3–2 ||  || Hiller (1–0–0) || LaBarbera (0–1–0) || 11,107* || 1–1–0 || Staples Center || W1
|- align="center" bgcolor="#ffdddd"
| 3 || September 16 || Coyotes || 2–1 || SO || Tordjman (1–0–0) || Hiller (1–0–1) || 16,888* || 1–1–1 || Honda Center || O1
|- align="center" bgcolor="#bbffbb"
| 4 || September 17 || @ Canucks || 3–2 || OT || Bryzgalov (1–0–0) || MacIntyre (0–0–1) ||  || 2–1–1 || General Motors Place || W1
|- align="center" bgcolor="#ffbbbb"
| 5 || September 19 || Sharks || 1–0 ||  || Greiss (1–0–0) || Hiller (1–1–1) ||  || 2–2–1 || Honda Center || L1
|- align="center" bgcolor="#ffbbbb"
| 6 || September 21 || @ Sharks || 3–1 ||  || Nabokov (1–0–0) || Bryzgalov (1–1–0) || 14,837* || 2–3–1 || HP Pavilion at San Jose || L2
|- align="center" bgcolor="#bbffbb"
| 7 || September 23 || Canucks || 5–0 ||  || Hiller (2–1–1) || Sanford (1–1–0) || 17,030* || 3–3–1 || Honda Center || W1
|-

|style="text-align:left;"|*Attendance Figure provided by ESPN

Regular season

The Ducks were the most penalized team during the regular season, with 408 power-play opportunities against.

|- align="center" bgcolor="#ffbbbb"
| 1 || September 29 || @ Kings || 4–1 ||  || Bernier (1–0–0) || Bryzgalov (0–1–0) || 17,551 || 0–1–0 || O2 Arena (in London, UK) || L1 || 0 
|- align="center" bgcolor="#bbffbb"
| 2 || September 30 || Kings || 4–1 ||  || Hiller (1–0–0) || LaBarbera (0–1–0) || 17,300 || 1–1–0 || O2 Arena (in London, UK) || W1 || 2
|-

|- align="center"  bgcolor="ffdddd"
| 3 || October 3 || @ Red Wings || 3–2 || SO || Hasek (1–0–0) || Bryzgalov (0–1–1) || 17,610 || 1–1–1 || Joe Louis Arena || O1 || bgcolor="bbffbb" | 3
|- align="center" bgcolor="ffbbbb"
| 4 || October 5 || @ Blue Jackets || 4–0 ||  || Leclaire (1–0–0) || Bryzgalov (0–2–1) || 17,852  || 1–2–1  || Nationwide Arena || L1 || bgcolor="bbcaff" | 3  
|- align="center" bgcolor="ffbbbb"
| 5 || October 6 || @ Penguins || 5–4 ||  || Fleury (1–1–0) || Hiller (1–1–0) || 17,132 || 1–3–1 || Mellon Arena || L2 || bgcolor="bbcaff" | 3 
|- align="center" bgcolor="bbffbb"
| 6 || October 10 || Bruins || 2–1 ||  || Bryzgalov (1–2–1) || Thomas (1–1–0) || 17,285 || 2–3–1 || Honda Center || W1 || bgcolor="bbcaff" | 5  
|- align="center" bgcolor="ffbbbb"
| 7 || October 14 || Wild || 2–0 ||  || Harding (1–0–0) || Giguere (0–1–0) || 17,174 || 2–4–1 || Honda Center || L1 || bgcolor="ffbbbb" | 5 
|- align="center" bgcolor="bbffbb"
| 8 || October 15 || Red Wings || 6–3 ||  || Bryzgalov (2–2–1) || Hasek (2–2–0) || 17,174 || 3–4–1 || Honda Center || W1 || bgcolor="bbcaff" | 7 
|- align="center" bgcolor="bbffbb"
| 9 || October 17 || Predators || 3–1 ||  || Giguere (1–1–0) || Mason (2–4–0) || 17,174 || 4–4–1 || Honda Center || W2 || bgcolor="bbffbb" | 9
|- align="center" bgcolor="ffbbbb"
| 10 || October 20 || @ Stars || 3–1 ||  || Turco (3–1–1) || Giguere (1–2–0) || 18,057 || 4–5–1 || American Airlines Center || L1 || bgcolor="bbcaff" | 9 
|- align="center" bgcolor="ffbbbb"
| 11 || October 23 || @ Blues || 4–2 ||  || Legace (4–2–0) || Giguere (1–3–0) || 14,764 || 4–6–1 || Scottrade Center || L2 || bgcolor="ffbbbb" | 9 
|- align="center" bgcolor="ffbbbb"
| 12 || October 25 || Coyotes || 1–0 ||  || Auld (2–2–0) || Bryzgalov‡ (2–3–1) || 17,174 || 4–7–1 || Honda Center || L3 || bgcolor="ffbbbb" | 9 
|- align="center" bgcolor="ffdddd"
| 13 || October 28 || Oilers || 3–2 || SO || Garon (2–1–0) || Giguere (1–3–1) || 17,174 || 4–7–2 || Honda Center || O1 || bgcolor="ffbbbb" | 10
|-

|- align="center" bgcolor="#bbffbb"
| 14 || November 1 || Blue Jackets || 1–2 || SO || Giguere (2–3–1) || Norrena (1–1–0) || 17,174 || 5–7–2 || Honda Center || W1 || bgcolor="ffbbbb" | 12 
|- align="center" bgcolor="#bbffbb"
| 15 || November 3 || @ Coyotes || 5–2 ||  || Giguere (3–3–1) || Auld (2–4–0) || 15,888 || 6–7–2 || Jobing.com Arena || W2 || bgcolor="ffbbbb" | 14
|- align="center" bgcolor="ffbbbb"
| 16 || November 5 || Stars || 5–0 ||  || Turco (4–3–1) || Giguere (3–4–1) || 17,174 || 6–8–2 || Honda Center || L2 || bgcolor="ffbbbb" | 14 
|- align="center" bgcolor="ffdddd"
| 17 || November 7 || Coyotes || 6–5 || OT || Auld (3–4–0) || Giguere (3–4–2) || 17,174 || 6–8–3 || Honda Center || O1 || bgcolor="ffbbbb" | 15
|- align="center" bgcolor="bbffbb"
| 18 || November 9 || Sharks || 2–3 || SO || Giguere (4–4–2) || Nabokov (7–7–0) || 17,174 || 7–8–3 || Honda Center || W1 || bgcolor="bbffbb" | 17 
|- align="center" bgcolor="bbffbb"
| 19 || November 13 || Kings || 3–4 || SO || Giguere (5–4–2)  || LaBarbera (4–4–0) || 17,174 || 8–8–3 || Honda Center || W2 || bgcolor="bbcaff" | 19
|- align="center" bgcolor="bbffbb"
| 20 || November 15 || @ Kings || 6–3 ||  || Giguere (6–4–2) || Aubin (3–2–0) || 18,118 || 9–8–3 || Staples Center || W3 || bgcolor="bbcaff" | 21 
|- align="center" bgcolor="bbffbb"
| 21 || November 17 || @ Sharks || 2–1 || SO || Giguere (7–4–2) || Nabokov (11–7–0) || 17,496 || 10–8–3 || HP Pavilion at San Jose || W4 || bgcolor="bbcaff" | 23 
|- align="center" bgcolor="ffbbbb"
| 22 || November 21 || @ Stars || 2–1 ||  || Giguere (7–5–2) || || 18,584 || 10–9–3 || American Airlines Center || L1 || bgcolor="bbcaff" | 23
|- align="center" bgcolor="ffdddd"
| 23 || November 23 || Coyotes || 4–3 || SO || Bryzgalov‡ (3–0–0) || Hiller (1–1–1) || 17,174  || 10–9–4 || Honda Center || O1 || bgcolor="ffbbbb" | 24
|- align="center" bgcolor="#bbffbb"
| 24 || November 25 || Kings || 2–3 ||  || Giguere (8–5–2)  || LaBarbera (5–7–0) || 17,174 || 11–9–4 || Honda Center || W1 || bgcolor="bbcaff" | 26 
|- align="center" bgcolor="ffbbbb"
| 25 || November 27 || @ Canucks || 0–4 ||  || Luongo (11–9–0) || Giguere (8–6–2) || 18,630 || 11–10–4 || General Motors Place || L1 || bgcolor="bbcaff" | 26 
|- align="center" bgcolor="#bbffbb"
| 26 || November 29 || @ Flames || 4–1 || || Giguere (9–6–2) || Kiprusoff (10–11–2) || 19,289  || 12–10–4 || Scotiabank Saddledome || W1 || bgcolor="bbcaff" | 28  
|- align="center" bgcolor="ffbbbb"
| 27 || November 30 || @ Oilers || 1–5 || || Roloson (6–10–1) || Giguere (9–7–2) || 16,839 || 12–11–4 || Rexall Place || L1 || bgcolor="bbcaff" | 28  
|-

|- align="center" bgcolor="#ffbbbb"
| 28 || December 2 || Oilers || 4–0 ||  || Garon (6–4–0) || Giguere (9–8–2) || 17,174 || 12–12–4 || Honda Center || L2 || bgcolor="ffbbbb" | 28 
|- align="center" bgcolor="#bbffbb"
| 29 || December 5 || Sabres || 4–1 ||  || Giguere (10–8–2) || Miller (10–11–1) || 17,174 || 13–12–4 || Honda Center || W1 || bgcolor="ffbbbb" | 30 
|- align="center" bgcolor="#bbffbb"
| 30 || December 7 || @ Blackhawks || 5–3 ||  || Giguere (11–8–2) || Khabibulin (10–8–2) || 17,734 || 14–12–4 || United Center || W2 || bgcolor="bbcaff" | 32 
|- align="center" bgcolor="#ffbbbb"
| 31 || December 8 || @ Predators || 4–2 ||  || Mason (8–10–2) || Hiller (1–2–1) || 13,469 || 14–13–4 || Sommet Center || L1 || bgcolor="bbcaff" | 32 
|- align="center" bgcolor="#bbffbb"
| 32 || December 10 || @ Blue Jackets || 4–3 || OT || Giguere (12–8–2) || Leclaire (10–6–3) ||  11,984 || 15–13–4 || Nationwide Arena || W1 || bgcolor="bbcaff" | 34
|- align="center" bgcolor="#ffbbbb"
| 33 || December 12 || Canucks || 3–2 ||  || Sanford (4–1–0) || Giguere (12–9–2) || 17,174 || 15–14–4 || Honda Center || L1 || bgcolor="bbcaff" | 34 
|- align="center" bgcolor="#ffbbbb"
| 34 || December 14 || Wild || 5–2 ||  || Harding (4–6–1) || Giguere (12–10–2) || 17,174 || 15–15–4 || Honda Center || L2 || bgcolor="ffbbbb" | 34 
|- align="center" bgcolor="#ffdddd"
| 35 || December 16 || Sharks || 2–1 || SO || Nabokov (18–10–4) || Giguere (12–10–3) || 17,174 || 15–15–5 || Honda Center || O1 || bgcolor="bbcaff" | 35 
|- align="center" bgcolor="#bbffbb"
| 36 || December 18 || @ Sharks || 2–0 ||  || Giguere (13–10–3) || Nabokov (18–11–4) || 17,197 || 16–15–5 || HP Pavilion at San Jose || W1 || bgcolor="bbcaff" | 37  
|- align="center" bgcolor="#bbffbb"
| 37 || December 19 || Avalanche || 2–1 || OT || Hiller (2–2–1) || Budaj (12–6–1) || 17,174 || 17–15–5 || Honda Center || W2 || bgcolor="bbcaff" | 39 
|- align="center" bgcolor="#bbffbb"
| 38 || December 22 || @ Sharks || 5–2 ||  || Giguere (14–10–3) || Nabokov (18–12–5) || 17,496 || 18–15–5 || HP Pavilion at San Jose || W3 || bgcolor="bbcaff" | 41  
|- align="center" bgcolor="#bbffbb"
| 39 || December 27 || @ Oilers || 2–1 ||  || Giguere (15–10–3) || Garon (9–8–1) || 16,839 || 19–15–5 || Rexall Place || W4 || bgcolor="bbcaff" | 43  
|- align="center" bgcolor="#ffbbbb"
| 40 || December 29 || @ Flames || 5–3 ||  || Kiprusoff (18–12–7) || Giguere (15–11–3) || 19,289 || 19–16–5 || Pengrowth Saddledome || L1 || bgcolor="bbcaff" | 43 
|- align="center" bgcolor="#ffbbbb"
| 41 || December 30 || Canucks || 2–1 ||  || Luongo (18–11–3) || Hiller (2–3–1) || 18,630 || 19–17–5 || General Motors Place || L2 || bgcolor="bbcaff" | 43  
|-

|- align="center" bgcolor="#bbffbb"
| 42 || January 2 || Blue Jackets || 2–1 ||  || Giguere (16–11–3) || Leclaire (13–8–3) || 17,174 || 20–17–5 || Honda Center || W1 || bgcolor="bbcaff" | 45  
|- align="center" bgcolor="#bbffbb"
| 43 || January 4 || Blackhawks || 2–1 ||  || Hiller (3–3–1) || Khabibulin (15–13–3) || 17,174 || 21–17–5 || Honda Center || W2 || bgcolor="bbcaff" | 47  
|- align="center" bgcolor="#ffdddd"
| 44 || January 5 || @ Coyotes || 3–2 || SO || Bryzgalov (12–8–1) || Giguere (16–11–4) || 16,159 || 21–17–6 || Jobing.com Arena || O1 || bgcolor="bbcaff" | 48  
|- align="center" bgcolor="#bbffbb"
| 45 || January 7 || Predators || 5–2 ||  || Giguere (17–11–4) || Ellis (10–5–0) || 17,174 || 22–17–6 || Honda Center || W1 || bgcolor="bbcaff" | 50  
|- align="center" bgcolor="#bbffbb"
| 46 || January 9 || Maple Leafs || 5–0 ||  || Giguere (18–11–4) || Toskala (13–12–4) || 17,174 || 23–17–6 || Honda Center || W2 || bgcolor="bbcaff" | 52 
|- align="center" bgcolor="#bbffbb"
| 47 || January 13 || Sharks || 4–3 || OT || Giguere (19–11–4) || Greiss (0–0–1) || 17,174 || 24–17–6 || Honda Center || W3 || bgcolor="bbcaff" | 54 
|- align="center" bgcolor="#bbffbb"
| 48 || January 15 || Stars || 4–2 ||  || Giguere (20–11–4) || Turco (17–10–4) || 17,174 || 25–17–6 || Honda Center || W4 || bgcolor="bbcaff" | 56 
|- align="center" bgcolor="#bbffbb"
| 49 || January 17 || @ Predators || 2–1 ||  || Giguere (21–11–4) || Mason (12–15–3) || 14,193 || 26–17–6 || Sommet Center || W5 || bgcolor="bbffbb" | 58 
|- align="center" bgcolor="#bbffbb"
| 50 || January 18 || @ Wild || 4–2 ||  || Hiller (4–3–1) || Harding (10–9–1) || 18,568 || 27–17–6 || Xcel Energy Center || W6 || bgcolor="bbffbb" | 60 
|- align="center" bgcolor="#ffbbbb"
| 51 || January 20 || @ Stars || 5–2 ||  || Turco (19–10–4) || Giguere (21–12–4) || 18,461 || 27–18–6 || American Airlines Center || L1 || bgcolor="bbcaff" | 60 
|- align="center" bgcolor="#ffbbbb"
| 52 || January 23 || Red Wings || 2–1 ||  || Hasek (17–7–2) || Giguere (21–13–4) || 17,174 || 27–19–6 || Honda Center || L2 || bgcolor="bbcaff" | 60 
|- align="center" bgcolor="#ffbbbb"
| 53 || January 24 || @ Kings || 3–1 ||  || LaBarbera (13–18–1) || Giguere (21–14–4) || 18,118 || 27–20–6 || Staples Center || L3 || bgcolor="bbcaff" | 60 
|- align="center" bgcolor="bbcaff"
|colspan="3" bgcolor="#bbcaff"| January 27: All-Star Game (East wins—Box) || 8–7 ||  || Thomas (BOS) || Legace (STL) || 18,644 || || Philips Arena || colspan=2 | Atlanta, GA
|- align="center" bgcolor="#ffbbbb"
| 54 || January 30 || @ Wild || 5–1 ||  || Backstrom (19–9–2) || Giguere (21–15–4) || 18,568 || 27–21–6 || Xcel Energy Center || L4 || bgcolor="bbcaff" | 60 
|- align="center"

|- align="center" bgcolor="#ffdddd"
| 55 || February 1 || @ Blues || 1–0 || SO || Legace (19–13–4) || Giguere (21–15–5) || 19,150 || 27–21–7 || Scottrade Center || O1 || bgcolor="bbcaff" | 61
|- align="center" bgcolor="#ffbbbb"
| 56 || February 2 || @ Flyers || 3–0 ||  || Biron (20–11–4) || Hiller (4–4–1) || 19,822 || 27–22–7 || Wachovia Center || L1 || bgcolor="bbcaff" | 61 
|- align="center" bgcolor="#bbffbb"
| 57 || February 5 || @ Islanders || 3–0 ||  || Giguere (22–15–5) || DiPietro (19–20–6) || 9,649 || 28–22–7 || Nassau Memorial Coliseum || W1 || bgcolor="bbcaff" | 63 
|- align="center" bgcolor="#bbffbb"
| 58 || February 7 || @ Rangers || 4–1 ||  || Giguere (23–15–5) || Lundqvist (24–21–5) || 18,200 || 29–22–7 || Madison Square Garden || W2 || bgcolor="bbcaff" | 65 
|- align="center" bgcolor="#bbffbb"
| 59 || February 8 || @ Devils || 2–1 ||  || Giguere (24–15–5) || Brodeur (28–19–3) || 15,332 || 30–22–7 || Prudential Center || W3 || bgcolor="bbcaff" | 67  
|- align="center" bgcolor="#bbffbb"
| 60 || February 10 || @ Red Wings || 3–2 ||  || Giguere (25–15–5)   || Osgood (22–5–2) || 20,066 || 31–22–7 || Joe Louis Arena || W4 || bgcolor="bbcaff" | 69 
|- align="center" bgcolor="#bbffbb"
| 61 || February 12 || @ Avalanche || 2–1 ||  || Giguere (26–15–5) || Theodore (15–13–2) || 16,257 || 32–22–7 || Pepsi Center || W5 || bgcolor="bbcaff" | 71 
|- align="center" bgcolor="#ffbbbb"
| 62 || February 15 || Stars || 4–2 ||  || Turco (25–12–4) || Giguere (26–16–5) || 17,323 || 32–23–7 || Honda Center || L1 || bgcolor="bbcaff" | 71 
|- align="center" bgcolor="#bbffbb"
| 63 || February 17 || Flames || 4–2 ||  || Giguere (27–16–5) || Kiprusoff (29–19–8) || 17,174 || 33–23–7 || Honda Center || W1 || bgcolor="bbcaff" | 73 
|- align="center" bgcolor="#bbffbb"
| 64 || February 20 || Avalanche || 3–2 || SO || Giguere (28–16–5) || Budaj (15–9–4) || 17,174 || 34–23–7 || Honda Center || W2 || bgcolor="bbcaff" | 75 
|- align="center" bgcolor="#bbffbb"
| 65 || February 22 || Blues || 2–1 || OT || Giguere (29–16–5) || Legace (23–16–7) || 17,174 || 35–23–7 || Honda Center || W3 || bgcolor="bbcaff" | 77 
|- align="center" bgcolor="#bbffbb"
| 66 || February 24 || Blackhawks || 6–3 ||  || Hiller (5–4–1) || Lalime (11–9–1) || 17,174 || 36–23–7 || Honda Center || W4 || bgcolor="bbcaff" | 79 
|- align="center" bgcolor="#bbffbb"
| 67 || February 29 || Flames || 3–1 ||  || Giguere (30–16–5) || Kiprusoff (32–20–9) || 17,174 || 37–23–7 || Honda Center || W5 || bgcolor="bbcaff" | 81 
|-

|- align="center" bgcolor="#bbffbb"
| 68 || March 3 || Senators || 3–1 ||  || Giguere (––) || Gerber (24–12–2) || 17,174 || 38–23–7 || Honda Center || W6 || bgcolor="bbcaff" | 83 
|- align="center" bgcolor="#ffbbbb"
| 69 || March 5 || @ Blackhawks || 3–0 ||  || Crawford (1–0–0) || Giguere (31–17–5)  || 16,666 || 38–24–7 || United Center || L1 ||  bgcolor="bbcaff" | 83
|- align="center" bgcolor="#ffbbbb"
| 70 || March 6 || @ Avalanche || 1–0 ||  || Theodore (21–17–2) || Hiller (5–5–1) || 18,007 || 38–25–7 || Pepsi Center || L2 || bgcolor="bbcaff" | 83  
|- align="center" bgcolor="#bbffbb"
| 71 || March 9 || Canadiens || 3–1 ||  || Giguere (32–17–5) || Price (16–11–3) || 17,174 || 39–25–7 || Honda Center || W1 || bgcolor="bbcaff" | 85  
|- align="center" bgcolor="#ffdddd"
| 72 || March 11 || @ Coyotes || 3–2 || SO || Bryzgalov (24–17–4) || Giguere (32–17–6) || 14,683 || 39–25–8 || Jobing.com Arena || O1 || bgcolor="bbcaff" | 86  
|- align="center" bgcolor="#bbffbb"
| 73 || March 12 || Canucks || 4–1 ||  || Hiller (6–5–1) || Luongo (31–21–9) || 17,174 || 40–25–8 || Honda Center || W1 || bgcolor="bbcaff" | 88  
|- align="center" bgcolor="#bbffbb"
| 74 || March 15 || Blues || 5–2 || || Giguere (33–17–6) || Legace (24–23–8) || 17,174 || 41–25–8 || Honda Center || W2 || bgcolor="bbcaff" | 90 
|- align="center" bgcolor="bbffbb"
| 75 || March 19 || @ Stars || 2–1 || || Giguere (34–17–6) || Turco (30–19–4) || 18,584 || 42–25–8 || American Airlines Center || W3 || bgcolor="bbcaff" | 92
|- align="center" bgcolor="ffbbbb"
| 76 || March 21 || @ Sharks || 2–1 ||  || Nabokov (43–20–8) || Hiller (6–6–1) || 17,496 || 42–26–8 || HP Pavilion at San Jose || L1 || bgcolor="bbcaff" | 92  
|- align="center" bgcolor="bbffbb"
| 77 || March 22 || @ Coyotes || 2–1 ||  || Hiller (7–6–1) || Bryzgalov (25–20–4) || 17,645 || 43–26–8 || Jobing.com Arena || W1 || bgcolor="bbcaff" | 94 
|- align="center" style="background: #000078; color: white"
| 78 || March 26 || Kings || 2–1 || SO || Hiller (8–6–1) || Ersberg (4–3–3) || 17,331 || 44–26–8 || Honda Center || W2 || 96 
|- align="center" bgcolor="ffbbbb"
| 79 || March 28 || Sharks || 3–1 ||  || Boucher (3–0–1) || Hiller (8–7–1)  || 17,334 || 44–27–8  || Honda Center || L1 || bgcolor="bbcaff" | 96 
|- align="center" bgcolor="bbffbb"
| 80 || March 30 || Stars || 3–2 || SO || Giguere (35–17–6) || Turco (31–20–6) || 17,174  || 45–27–8  || Honda Center || W1 || bgcolor="bbcaff" | 98  
|-

|- align="center"  bgcolor="bbffbb"
| 81 || April 5 || @ Kings || 4–3 ||  || Giguere (36–17–6) || Cloutier (2–4–1) || 18,118 || 46–27–8 || Staples Center || W2 || bgcolor="bbcaff" | 100
|- align="center"  bgcolor="bbffbb"
| 82 || April 6 || Coyotes || 3–2 || SO || Hiller (9–7–1) || Bryzgalov (26–22–5) || 17,269 || 47–27–8 || Honda Center || W3 || bgcolor="bbcaff" | 102 
|-

Postseason
The Ducks enter the 2007–08 season as defending Stanley Cup champions.  They were defeated in the series 4 games to 2 by their division rival Dallas Stars.

|- align="center" bgcolor="#ffbbbb"
| 1 || April 10 || Stars || 4–0 || || Turco (1–0)  || Giguere (0–1) || 17,191 || 0–1 || Honda Center || L1
|- align="center" bgcolor="#ffbbbb"
| 2 || April 12 || Stars || 5–2 || || Turco (2–0)  || Giguere (0–2) || 17,181 || 0–2 || Honda Center || L2
|- align="center" bgcolor="#bbffbb"
| 3 || April 15 || @ Stars || 4–2 || || Giguere (1–2)  || Turco (2–1) || 18,532 || 1–2 || American Airlines Center || W1
|- align="center" bgcolor="#ffbbbb"
| 4 || April 17 || @ Stars || 3–1 || || Turco (3–1)  || Giguere (1–3) || 18,532 || 1–3 || American Airlines Center || L1
|- align="center" bgcolor="#bbffbb"
| 5 || April 18 || Stars || 5–2 || || Giguere (2–3)  || Turco (3–2) || 17,199 || 2–3 || Honda Center || W1
|- align="center" bgcolor="#ffbbbb"
| 6 || April 20 || @ Stars || 4–1 || || Turco (4–2)  || Giguere (2–4) || 18,532 || 2–4 || American Airlines Center || L1
|-

Standings

Divisional standings

Conference standings

Player statistics

Skaters
Note: GP = Games played; G = Goals; A = Assists; Pts = Points; PIM = Penalty minutes

Goaltenders
Note: GP = Games played; TOI = Time on ice (minutes); W = Wins; L = Losses; OT = Overtime/shootout losses; GA = Goals against; SO = Shutouts; SV% = Save percentage; GAA = Goals against average

†Denotes player spent time with another team before joining Ducks. Stats reflect time with Ducks only.
‡Traded mid-season.

Awards and records

Records
February 1: Jean-Sebastien Giguere recorded his 28th shutout with the Ducks, beating Guy Hebert's team record.

Milestones

Transactions
The Ducks have been involved in the following transactions during the 2007–08 season.

Trades

Free agents

Waivers

Draft picks
The following were Anaheim's picks at the 2007 NHL Entry Draft in Columbus, Ohio.  The Ducks drafted 16th overall with a pick acquired from the Tampa Bay Lightning.  Their own pick, 30th overall, was dealt to the Edmonton Oilers in the Chris Pronger trade.

Farm teams

Portland Pirates
The Portland Pirates are the Ducks American Hockey League affiliate in 2007–08.

Augusta Lynx
The Augusta Lynx are the Ducks affiliate in the ECHL.

See also 
 Anaheim Ducks
 Honda Center
2007–08 NHL season

Other Anaheim–based teams in 2007–08
Los Angeles Angels of Anaheim (Angel Stadium of Anaheim)
 2007 Los Angeles Angels of Anaheim season
 2008 Los Angeles Angels of Anaheim season

References

Player stats: Anaheim Ducks player stats on espn.com
Game log: Anaheim Ducks game log on espn.com
Team standings: NHL standings on espn.com

Anaheim Ducks seasons
Anaheim Ducks season, 2007-08
Mighty
Mighty Ducks of Anaheim
Mighty Ducks of Anaheim